Comparative and Continental Philosophy is a peer-reviewed and fully refereed journal that appears tri-annually and publishes leading edge papers covering different areas of continental philosophy. It is published by Comparative and Continental Philosophy Circle and is included in ATLA Religion Database, ATLASerials (ATLAS) and The Philosopher's Index.

See also 
 List of philosophy journals

References

External links 
 

Triannual journals
Philosophy journals
Continental philosophy literature
Taylor & Francis academic journals
Publications established in 2009